The Vampire Detective is a South Korean television drama starring Lee Joon, Oh Jung-se, Lee Se-young and Lee Chung-ah. The series aired on Sundays, from March 27, 2016, to June 12, 2016, on OCN for 12 episodes.

Plot 
Yoon San (Lee Joon) works as a private detective with his friend Yong Goo-Hyung (Oh Jung-se). One day, Yoon San is turned into a vampire. He remains a private detective who solves cases for his clients all the while uncovering the secrets from his past.

Cast

Main 
 Lee Joon as Yoon San
 Oh Jung-se as Yong Goo-hyung
 Lee Se-young as Han Gyeo-wool
 Lee Chung-ah as Yo-na

Supporting 
 Jo Bok-rae as Kang Tae-woo
 Ahn Se-ha as Detective Park Hyung-sa
 Lee Jung-hyuk as Ji Seung-cheol	
 Jei as Se-ra
 Kim Yoon-hye as Jung Yoo-jin
 Kim Ki-moo as Doctor Hwang
 Oh Hee-joon as Yoo Goo-hyung	
 Choi Gwi-hwa as Jang Tae-shik
 Kim Ha-rin
 Jo Won-hee
 Han Ho-yong
 Lee Hae-young
 Ha Joo-hee

Special appearances 
 Han Soo-yeon as Yeon-joo (Ep. 1)
 Jae Hee as Han Gyo-min (Ep. 1)
 Choi Song-hyun as Seo Seung-hee (Ep. 2)
 Park Jin-joo as Radio Staffer (Ep. 2)
 Kim Young-jae as Kim Kyung-soo (Ep. 2)
 Park Doo-shik as Choi Cheol-woo (Ep. 3)
 Park Hyo-jun as Choi Cheol-yong (Ep. 3)
 Kim Nan-hee as Moon Mee-jin (Ep. 4)
 Han Eun-seo as Lee Soo-yeon (Ep. 6)
 Lee Ah-jin as Moon Mi-so (Ep. 9)

Ratings
Note: The blue color indicates the lowest rating while the red color indicates the highest rating.

Note: This drama airs on cable channel / pay TV which has a relatively small audience compared to free-to-air TV / public broadcasters (KBS, MBC, SBS, and EBS).

Awards and nominations

See also 
List of vampire television series

References

External links 
  
 

2016 South Korean television series debuts
2016 South Korean television series endings
Television shows set in Seoul
Vampire detective shows
South Korean crime television series
Horror fiction television series
South Korean fantasy television series
OCN television dramas
Occult detective fiction